Derek Clement Arnould is a Canadian former diplomat. He was concurrently appointed Ambassador Extraordinary and Plenipotentiary to Madagascar and High Commissioner to Mauritius, Seychelles and Tanzania.

External links
 Foreign Affairs and International Trade Canada Complete List of Posts 

Year of birth missing (living people)
Living people
Ambassadors of Canada to Madagascar
High Commissioners of Canada to Mauritius
High Commissioners of Canada to Seychelles
High Commissioners of Canada to Tanzania